The 2017 CAA men's soccer tournament, was the 35th edition of the tournament. It determined the Colonial Athletic Association's automatic berth into the 2017 NCAA Division I Men's Soccer Championship.

William & Mary won the CAA title for a record eighth time. The Tribe defeated UNC Wilmington 4–2 in the championship match. Tribe striker, Antonio Bustamante won the CAA Tournament MVP award.

Seeding 

The top six programs qualified for the CAA Tournament. The top two seeds, being the regular season champion and runner-up earned a bye to the semifinals of the tournament.

Bracket

Results

Quarterfinals

Semifinals

Final

Statistics

Top goalscorers

All-Tournament team 
 Antonio Bustamante (Most Outstanding Performer)
 Remi Frost, William & Mary
 Ryder Bell, William & Mary
 Riley Spain, William & Mary
 Julio Moncada, UNCW
 Phillip Goodrum, UNCW
 Emil Elveroth, UNCW
 TJ Bush, James Madison
 Yannick Franz, James Madison
 Leland Archer, Charleston
 Kevin Shields, Charleston

See also 
 2017 CAA Women's Soccer Tournament

References 

CAA Men's Soccer Tournament
Colonial Athletic Association Men's Soccer